The International Association of Geomagnetism and Aeronomy (IAGA) is an international scientific association that focuses on the study of terrestrial and planetary magnetism and space physics.

IAGA is one of the eight associations of the International Union of Geodesy and Geophysics. It is a non-governmental body funded through the subscriptions paid to IUGG by its member countries. IAGA have been responsible for developing and maintaining the International Geomagnetic Reference Field, a reference for the magnetic field of the Earth that was adopted in 1968 and is updated every five years. The most recent version is IGRF-12.

History 
IAGA has a long history and can trace its origins to the Commission for Terrestrial Magnetism and Atmospheric Electricity, part of the World Meteorological Organization originated from the International Meteorological Organization (IMO), which was founded in 1873. At the First IUGG General Assembly (Rome, 1922), the Section de Magnétisme et Electricité Terrestres became one of the constituent sections of the Union. At the IV IUGG General Assembly (Stockholm, 1930), it became the International Association of Terrestrial Magnetism and Electricity. It took its present name at the X IUGG General Assembly (Rome, 1954).

Commissions 
IAGA is subdivided into the following divisions and commissions, each with working groups on subjects of interest:

 Division I: Internal Magnetic Fields
 Division II: Aeronomic Phenomena
 Division III: Magnetospheric Phenomena
 Division IV: Solar Wind and Interplanetary Field
 Division V: Geomagnetic Observatories, Surveys and Analyses
 Division VI: Electromagnetic Induction in the Earth and Planetary Bodies
 Interdivisional Commission on Developing Countries
 Interdivisional Commission on History
 Interdivisional Commission on Education and Outreach
 Interdivisional Commission on Space Weather

See also 
 Intermagnet
 List of geoscience organizations

References

Further reading

External links 
 

Geophysics societies
International scientific organizations
1873 establishments in Europe